Ambush is a 1999 Finnish war film directed by Olli Saarela. Literally "Road of Rukajärvi", the film debuted on 22 January 1999 in Finland, after which it was released internationally. The film is based on a book written by Antti Tuuri and its leads are played by Peter Franzén as Lt. Eero Perkola and Irina Björklund as Kaarina Vainikainen, Lt. Perkola's love.

Rukajärvi (Rugozero) is a municipality (as well as a lake) in Karelia, Russia, and it was occupied by the Finnish Army during the Continuation War of 1941–44.

Plot summary

Cast
 Peter Franzén as Lieutenant Eero Perkola
 Irina Björklund as Lotta Kaarina Vainikainen
 Kari Heiskanen as Lance Corporal Jussi Lukkari
 Taisto Reimaluoto as Corporal Unto Saarinen
 Kari Väänänen as Corporal Tauno Snicker
 Tommi Eronen as Private Simo Karppinen
 Pekka Heikkinen as Corporal Evert Rönkkö
 Pekka Huotari as Private Martti Raassina
 Tero Jartti as Private Moilanen
 Rauno Juvonen as Private Hämäläinen

Awards
The film won seven Jussi Awards in 2000 including Best Film, Best Direction, Best Photography, Best Edit, Best Staging, Best Sound Design and Best Score. The film was also entered into the 21st Moscow International Film Festival.

See also

 Winter War
 Talvisota (film) a film of another Antti Tuuri novel about Finland's Winter War

References

External links
 

1999 films
Continuation War
Eastern Front of World War II films
Films based on Finnish novels
Films set in Russia
1990s Finnish-language films
Films directed by Olli Saarela
Films scored by Tuomas Kantelinen
1990s war films
Finnish World War II films